Manfeild: Circuit Chris Amon (formerly Manfeild Autocourse) is a motor sport circuit located in Feilding, New Zealand. It was built by the Manawatu Car Club in 1973 as a purpose-built course. In 1990 extra land was acquired and the circuit extension built, bringing Manfeild up to international standards. The circuit was renamed the Manfeild: Circuit Chris Amon, in honour of former New Zealand Formula One driver Chris Amon, on 25 November 2016.

History
The original  circuit was built by the Manawatu Car Club Incorporated with the first event being held in 1973. A purpose designed venue with an uninterrupted view of the action, the circuit has workshop garages, hospitality suites and toilet blocks and sealed access roads throughout the pit paddock area.

The name "Manfeild" was derived from "Manawatu" being the region the circuit is in and "Feilding" the town it is in.

In 1990 the Car Club began looking at wider issues of governance and development. Extra land acquired extended the track to full International standards, and also accommodates Agricultural/Pastoral Shows.

In October 2004 three land owners, Manawatu District Council, Feilding IA&P and the Manawatu Car Club deeded their land and formed the Manfeild Park Trust. 
2022 board members are Hamish Waugh (chairman), Amanda Linsley, Stefan Speller, Stella Rackham and Kevin Hansen.

Manfeild Park now encompasses what is now known as the Manfeild Circuit Chris Amon and the developing land that was the Feilding Race Course.

Manfeild has held the New Zealand Grand Prix on seventeen occasions (1992–1995, 2008–2020).

The circuit 
A quick lap around the circuit involves smooth entries and exits, maintaining good corner speed and maximising terminal speeds on the straights.

The Grand Prix is not held over the full  circuit. The FIA Track license is for the  circuit in a clockwise direction only. However Motorcycle racing can be held in the anticlockwise direction if approved by the Steward on the day. Motorcycles can also use the full  circuit, but it is not advised unless a protective airfence is bought in for the  back straight wall. The back  circuit is used for club meetings and driver training.

Layout configurations

Lap records

The overall  lap record has been updated to reflect the correct record for the Clockwise direction. While Earl Bamber does hold the TRS record on Manfeild, it is not the official overall record. Simon Wills took the record off Graeme Lawrence who set a 1.02.100 record in 1976 in a F5000 Lola T332 (Car#14 painting in Marlboro Colours). There is record of faster times around Manfeild, but not during a race. Kenny Smith is reputed to have completed a 0.58 lap in a F5000 set in the early seventies, but it was only a demo lap. Johnny Reid has also completed a sub minute lap in an A1GP car, but again only as a demonstration run and promotion for the series running in New Zealand at the time.

While Manfeild now only runs clockwise, there is also an anti-clockwise record held by Greg Murphy at 1.00.81 in a Formula Holden Reynard 92D set in 1995. The official race lap records at the Manfeild: Circuit Chris Amon are listed as:

Notes

References

External links
Official Website
D1NZ Series' tracks info
Toyota Racing Series' tracks info
Manfeild Autocourse in Google Maps

Superbike World Championship circuits
Sports venues in Manawatū-Whanganui
Motorsport venues in New Zealand
New Zealand Grand Prix
Feilding